Dr. Hook & the Medicine Show (shortened to Dr. Hook in 1975) is an American rock band, formed in Union City, New Jersey. The band had commercial success in the 1970s with hit singles "Sylvia's Mother", "The Cover of 'Rolling Stone'" (both 1972), "Only Sixteen" (1975), "A Little Bit More" (1976), "Sharing the Night Together" (1978), "When You're in Love with a Beautiful Woman" (1979), "Better Love Next Time" (1979), and "Sexy Eyes" (1980). In addition to its own material, Dr. Hook and the Medicine Show performed songs written by the poet Shel Silverstein.

The band had eight years of hits in the United States. Its music, spanning novelty songs, acoustic ballads, and soft rock, was played on Top 40, easy listening, and country music outlets throughout the English-speaking world.

After 1975, the band recorded under the name Dr. Hook.

History

Founding of the band 
The founding core of the band consisted of George Cummings, Ray Sawyer, and Billy Francis, who had worked together in a band called the Chocolate Papers. Cummings, Sawyer and Francis started a new band and included primary vocalist Dennis Locorriere, who initially joined as a bass player.

The new band was named Dr. Hook and the Medicine Show: Tonic for the Soul. The name was inspired by Sawyer's eyepatch and a reference to Captain Hook of the Peter Pan fairy tale. Sawyer lost his right eye in a near-fatal car crash in Oregon in 1967, and thereafter wore an eyepatch.

Career: 1968-1971 
The band played in New Jersey, first with drummer Popeye Phillips, who had also been in the Chocolate Papers, and later with a session drummer who had played with the Flying Burrito Brothers. Phillips left the band and was replaced by drummer Joseph Olivier. When the band began recording its first album, Olivier was replaced by session player Jay David, who became a band member in 1968.

In 1970, the band's demo tapes were heard by Ron Haffkine, musical director on Who Is Harry Kellerman and Why Is He Saying Those Terrible Things About Me?. Haffkine asked the band to record two songs for the film, including "The Last Morning" and "Bunky and Lucille", which the band can be seen performing in the film. The film helped Dr. Hook and the Medicine Show secure their first recording contract.

The group met with Clive Davis of CBS Records. In the meeting, David used a wastebasket to keep the beat, and Francis danced on the mogul's desk while Sawyer, Locorriere, and Cummings played and sang. With the CBS Records deal, the band experienced international success over the next 12 years with Haffkine as the group's manager and producer.

Career: 1972 
Haffkine, having a knack for picking songs, quickly became Dr. Hook's No. 1 A&R man, as well as their producer and manager. Silverstein wrote all the songs for their self-titled debut album, released in 1972. Doctor Hook featured lead vocals, guitar, bass and harmonica by Locorriere, guitarist Cummings, and singer Sawyer, plus drummer David and keyboard player Billy Francis. The album sold over one million copies, and was awarded a gold disc by the RIAA on August 2, 1972. It has been released 20 times in the US, Canada and Europe.

The single "Sylvia's Mother", a subtle parody of teen-heartbreak weepers, flopped on first release, but with some more promotional muscle became the band's first million-seller, and hit the top five in the summer of 1972. Other titles on the album included "Marie Lavaux", "Sing Me a Rainbow", "Hey Lady Godiva", "Four Years Older Than Me", "Kiss It Away", "Makin' It Natural", "I Call That True Love", "When She Cries", "Judy", and "Mama, I'll Sing One Song for You".

Silverstein continued to write songs for Dr. Hook, including their entire second album, Sloppy Seconds, released in the US, Australia, Europe and Canada. It featured some of their most popular songs, including "Freakin' at the Freaker's Ball" and "The Cover of Rolling Stone". Other titles on the album were "If I'd Only Come and Gone", "The Things I Didn't Say", "Carry Me Carrie", "Get My Rocks Off", "Last Mornin'", "I Can't Touch the Sun", "Queen of the Silver Dollar", "Turn On the World", and "Stayin' Song". The album was listed in the Billboard 200 in 1973.

The band's second single, "The Cover of 'Rolling Stone'" (1972) from Sloppy Seconds, was another million-selling disc, poking fun at the idea that a musician had "made it" if they had been pictured on the cover of Rolling Stone magazine.

In 1972, the band added a full-time bassist, Jance Garfat, and another guitarist, Rik Elswit.

Haffkine visited Jann Wenner, one of the founders of Rolling Stone, proclaiming "I’ve just given you guys the best commercial for this rag that you’ll ever get." Wenner then sent Cameron Crowe (who later wrote and directed Almost Famous about his time as a music journalist), then 16 years old, to interview the band for issue 131 (March 1973). Dr. Hook and the Medicine Show appeared on the cover, albeit in caricature rather than in a photograph.

In the United Kingdom, the BBC Radio network refused to play "The Cover of 'Rolling Stone'", because it considered doing so would be advertising a trademark name. CBS Records responded by setting up a phone line that would play the song to anyone willing to dial in, which helped build the buzz. The BBC found itself able to play the song only after some of its DJs edited themselves shouting the words "Radio Times" (a BBC-owned magazine) over "Rolling Stone".

Career: 1973-1974 

In 1973, all was not well for Haffkine and Dr. Hook & the Medicine Show. The group had a difficult time meeting the high expectations created by Sloppy Seconds, and the result was Belly Up!, which Huey noted "was unfortunately prophetic". Belly Up! included "Acapulco Goldie", "Penicillin Penny", "Life Ain't Easy", "When Lily Was Queen", "Monterey Jack", "You Ain't Got the Right", "Put a Little Bit On Me", "Ballad of ...", "Roland the Roadie Gertrude the Groupie", "Come On In", and "The Wonderful Soup Stone". The album was sold in the US, UK, Europe, and Canada. Dr. Hook was just as famed for their crazed stage antics, which ranged from surreal banter to impersonating their own opening acts, but the group's nonchalance about business matters led to bankruptcy. "If we were in the black when we finished a tour, we'd party into the red," says Locorriere. They were forced to file bankruptcy in 1974, although they continued to tour incessantly.

The Medicine Show's lineup changed a few more times over the years. When David left the group in 1973, he was replaced by John Wolters. The next to depart was founding band member Cummings, who left in 1975 due to personal and musical differences. The band did not replace him. When Elswit was diagnosed with cancer a couple of years later, the band added Bob "Willard" Henke (formerly of Goose Creek Symphony). Elswit recovered and returned to the lineup, but they kept Henke on as well for a while.

In 1974 Dr. Hook recorded an album that was to be titled Fried Face; it was not released.

Career: 1975-1985

The band shortened its name to Dr. Hook in 1975. They signed with Capitol Records in 1975, releasing the aptly titled Bankrupt. Unlike previous projects, this album included original material written by the group. Bankrupt included "Levitate", "Let Me Be Your Lover", "Only Sixteen", "I Got Stoned And I Missed It", "Bubblin' Up", "Wups", "The Millionaire", "Everybody's Making It Big But Me", "Cooky And Lila", "Everybody Loves Me", "On The Way To The Bottom" and "Do Downs". The hit from the project was a reworked version of Sam Cooke's "Only Sixteen" (US number 6), revitalizing their career and charted in the top ten in 1976. Haffkine discovered a song titled "A Little Bit More" written and originally performed by Bobby Gosh and released on his 1973 album Sitting in the Quiet, on a record he purchased for 35 cents at a flea market in San Francisco. The band covered and released the song, which reached number 11 on the US Billboard Hot 100 and spent two weeks at number nine on the Cash Box Top 100. It also reached number two on the UK Singles Chart, matching "Sylvia's Mother". The 1976 album "A Little Bit More" contained "More Like The Movies", "A Little Bit More", "The Radio", "Up On The Mountain", "If Not You", "Jungle To The Zoo", "Bad Eye Bill", "What About You", "I Need The High" and "A Couple More Years".

Follow-ups to "A Little Bit More" included "Sharing the Night Together" (US number 6), "When You're in Love with a Beautiful Woman" (US number 6), "Better Love Next Time", and "Sexy Eyes" (US number 5), which featured prominent female backup singers. Save for "A Little Bit More" (US number 11), all the singles mentioned above were certified million-sellers. "When You're in Love with a Beautiful Woman" reached number 1 for several weeks in 1979 in the UK and the group had another UK hit single with "Better Love Next Time" (number 12). Though the band toured constantly, they had not yet managed to turn their success with singles into album sales.

A Little Bit More was certified double gold in Australia in November 1976.

Pleasure & Pain (1978) was Dr. Hook's first gold album in the US. According to Steve Huey, of All Music Guide, it solidified their reputation as "disco-tinged balladeers". But Sawyer was increasingly upset at the commercial direction the group's sound was taking. The band had changed labels again, to Casablanca Records in 1980, but could not replicate earlier successes. In late 1980, Dr. Hook released "Girls Can Get It" (US number 34) and had their final top 40 hit (which peaked in the US at number 25) with "Baby Makes Her Blue-Jeans Talk" in 1982.

Ray Sawyer left in 1983 to pursue a solo career, while the band continued to tour successfully for another couple of years, ending with Dr. Hook's One and Only Farewell Tour in 1985, with Locorriere as the sole frontman.

After Dr. Hook: 1985 to present 
After Dr. Hook split up, Dennis Locorriere retained ownership of the name of the band. However, from 1988 to 2015, Sawyer was granted a license to tour separately as "Ray Sawyer of Dr. Hook" or "Dr. Hook featuring Ray Sawyer" (joined for a time in 2001 by Billy Francis); Sawyer did not perform publicly after his last tour ended in October 2015 and died on December 31, 2018, at the age of 81.

Billy Francis joined Sawyer in 2001 during his Dr. Hook concerts. He died on May 23, 2010, at age 68.

In the years after the original band split, Dennis Locorriere has released several solo albums and toured under the names Voice of Dr. Hook and Dennis Locorriere Celebrates Dr. Hook Hits and History Tour. Now fronting the band Dr Hook starring Dennis Locorriere, he started the Dr Hook 50th Anniversary World Tour in 2019, but this was postponed due to Locorriere undergoing a prostate procedure resulting in kidney issues. The band resumed their 50th Anniversary Tour on September 3, 2021, with a show at Manchester's Bridgewater Hall and with shows scheduled for Scandinavia, the UK, and Ireland in 2022. Currently Locorriere's version of Dr Hook is made up of John Maher, Michelle Cordelli, Damien Cooper, Tim Bye, Jon Poole, and Ryan Farmery.

Former guitarist and keyboardist Bob 'Willard' Henke died on February 2, 2023, at the age of 71.

Members
Dennis Locorriere - vocals, guitar, bass, harmonica (1968–1985, 2019–present)
Ray Sawyer - vocals, guitar, percussion, congas, maracas (1967–1983, 1988–2015, died 2018)
Billy Francis - keyboards, vocals (1968–1985, 2001–2010; died 2010)
George Cummings - lead and steel guitars, vocals (1968–1975)
John "Jay" David - drums (1968–1973)
Rik Elswit - guitar (1972–1985)
Jance Garfat - bass (1972–1985; died 2006)
John Wolters - drums (1973–1982, 1983–1985; died 1997)
Bob 'Willard' Henke - guitar, keyboards (1976–1980; died 2023)
Rod Smarr - guitar (1980–1985; died 2012)
Walter Hartman - drums (1982–1983)
Leonard Wolfe - keyboards (1983–1985)
Joseph Olivier - drums (1968)

Timeline

Discography

Studio and live albums
(for the 1975 Bankrupt and 1980 Rising albums the band name was shortened to Dr. Hook)

Compilation albums

Singles

Notes

References

External links

1968 establishments in New Jersey
1985 disestablishments in New Jersey
American country rock groups
American soft rock music groups
Capitol Records artists
Musical groups established in 1968
Musical groups disestablished in 1985